The following is a list of soundtracks that have been released for the TV show One Tree Hill.

One Tree Hill

One Tree Hill – Music from the WB Television Series, Vol. 1 is a compilation album, compiled of songs featured in the teen drama One Tree Hill (which at the time this album was released aired on The WB, and later on The CW). It was released on January 25, 2005 on Maverick Records.

Friends with Benefit

Friends with Benefit: Music from the Television Series One Tree Hill, Volume 2 was released on February 7, 2006 and a portion of the proceeds has been donated to The National Breast Cancer Foundation. A story regarding the album's creation by characters Peyton Sawyer and Ellie Harp to raise funds for breast cancer research featured as a plot element on the third season of the show. Several of the artists appearing on the album also appeared on the show, including Gavin DeGraw, Fall Out Boy, Audioslave, Tyler Hilton as well as leukemia survivor Andrew McMahon and his band, Jack's Mannequin. Bethany Joy Lenz who portrays Haley James Scott in the series also sang a song on the show that appeared on this album. The album debuted and peaked at No. 54 on the Billboard 200 and No. 3 on the Billboard Top Soundtracks chart. Allmusic gave the album 3 out of 5 stars, concluding the compilation was an "eclectic set that improves on the original album."

The Road Mix

The Road Mix: Music from the Television Series One Tree Hill, Volume 3, the third soundtrack compiled of music featured on the teen drama One Tree Hill (which airs on The CW in the United States) was released on April 3, 2007.

Music from One Tree Hill

Music from One Tree Hill is an iTunes Plus soundtrack features songs from the sixth season of the teen drama One Tree Hill, which airs on The CW. The iTunes description reads "In the five years since its inception, the teen drama One Tree Hill has established itself as a musical force in the world of television. The smalltown escapades are invariably scored by some of the more interesting musical talents in the world today – putting the show in the same career-aiding force for new musicians as programs like The O.C. and Grey's Anatomy. The show has also brought many artists into the plot line, either as performers (see Sheryl Crow) or the occasional love interest (see Fall Out Boy's Pete Wentz). Now you can catch up with music that has been featured in the most current season – these are the tracks you won't find on any other One Tree Hill soundtrack."

Charts

Commercial performance

References

Television soundtracks
Film and television discographies